This is a list of the number-one compilation albums in New Zealand for the decade of the 2000s from the Official New Zealand Music Chart, compiled by Recorded Music NZ, starting form 5 January 2003.

Number ones

References 

New Zealand compilation albums
2000s
2000s in New Zealand music